Nesbit Christopher Bentley (16 April 1928 – 5 August 2019) was a Fijian sailor. He competed in the Finn event at the 1956 Summer Olympics.

References

External links
 
 

1929 births
2019 deaths
Fijian male sailors (sport)
Olympic sailors of Fiji
Finn class sailors
Sailors at the 1956 Summer Olympics – Finn
Sportspeople from Suva